Ruperto Long (born 23 December 1952 in Rosario, Uruguay), Uruguayan engineer, politician and writer.

Biography
Long got his engineering degree from the Universidad de la República; later he studied technology management at Harvard Business School.

He worked in several Uruguayan public bodies, including UTE, and LATU, which he presided (1990–2003).

He served as Senator, representing the National Party (2005–2010).

He is also a writer. His main publications are:
2002, Che Bandoneón.
2009, Hablando claro.
2012, No dejaré memorias. El enigma del Conde de Lautréamont.

References 

Living people
1952 births
People from Rosario, Uruguay
University of the Republic (Uruguay) alumni
Harvard Business School alumni
Uruguayan civil engineers
National Party (Uruguay) politicians
Uruguayan male writers
Members of the Senate of Uruguay